"Do Anything" is the debut single of American pop group Natural Selection. The song was written by group members Elliot Erickson and Frederick Thomas, who also produced the track, and the rap was written and performed by Ingrid Chavez. American actress and singer Niki Haris provides the song's spoken lyrics. A new jack swing and funk-pop song, it is the opening track on Natural Selection's self-titled, only studio album. Released as a single in 1991, "Do Anything" became a hit in the United States, where it reached the number-two position on the Billboard Hot 100 chart. Worldwide, it became a top-10 hit in Australia and New Zealand while peaking at number 24 in Canada.

Critical reception
Rolling Stone magazine featured the song on their list of "18 Awesome Prince Rip-Offs", comparing Frederick Thomas's vocals on the song to those of fellow American musician Prince. Music & Media magazine also compared the song to Prince's work, calling its chorus "snappy" and its melody "asserted", while Tom Breihan of Stereogum referred to the track as "K-Mart-brand Prince". Jeff Giles of pop culture website Popdose wrote that the song is "deeply, deeply silly," commenting on its "horrible" lyrics, "dated" production, and "painfully bad" rap, but he noted that the song is difficult to hate overall. He went on to say that if Natural Selection had released this song and nothing else, its popularity would have persisted more, and he also predicted that if American rock band Fall Out Boy covered the song, it would become a summer hit. AllMusic reviewer Alex Henderson called the track "likeable" and appreciated that it was original compared to other urban contemporary songs released during the early 1990s.

Chart performance
"Do Anything" debuted on the US Billboard Hot 100 at number 58, becoming the Hot Shot Debut of August 10, 1991. Ten issues later, the song reached its peak of number two. It spent its final week on the Hot 100 at number 27 on December 28, 1991, spending a total of 21 weeks on the listing. It was the United States' 32nd-most-succeful single of 1991. In Canada, after debuting at number 92 on October 5, 1991, the song rose up the chart until reaching number 24 on November 23. "Do Anything" was not as successful in Europe, peaking at number 48 on the Dutch Single Top 100 and number 69 on the UK Singles Chart, but in Sweden, it debuted and peaked at number 21 in November 1991. The single became a top-10 hit in both Australia and New Zealand, reaching number 10 in the former nation and number nine in the latter.

Track listings

US 12-inch single
A1. "Do Anything" (Justin Strauss Remix) – 6:00
A2. "Do Anything" (Just Dubbin Dub) – 4:30
B1. "Do Anything" (Just Right Mix) – 4:35
B2. "Do Anything" (Just Right Dub) – 4:50
B3. "Do Anything" (radio edit) – 3:55

US cassette single and European 7-inch single
 "Do Anything" (single mix) – 3:55
 "Do Anything" (raw mix) – 4:11

UK and European 12-inch single
A1. "Do Anything" (Justin Strauss Remix) – 6:00
A2. "Do Anything" (Just Dubbin Dub) – 4:30
B1. "Do Anything" (Just Right Mix) – 4:35
B2. "Do Anything" (Just Right Dub) – 4:50

Personnel
Personnel are taken from the US cassette single liner notes and cassette notes.
 Elliot Erickson – keyboards, drum programming, writer, producer, mixer, engineer
 Frederick Thomas – lead and background vocals, writer, producer
 Niki Haris – spoken vocals
 Ingrid Chavez – rap writer
 Brian Malouf – additional production and mixing

Charts

Weekly charts

Year-end charts

Certifications

References

1991 debut singles
American pop songs
East West Records singles
Funk songs
New jack swing songs